The Magnificat Baroque Ensemble, or Magnificat, is an early music ensemble of voices and instruments specializing in the Baroque music of the 17th century under the artistic direction of Baroque cellist Warren Stewart. Stewart founded the ensemble in San Francisco in 1989 with Baroque harpsichordist Susan Harvey. Harvey resigned in 2000, and the group has remained under the sole musical direction of Stewart since then. The group derives its name from the first word of the Latin translation of the Canticle of Mary in the Gospel of Luke, Magnificat anima mea, "My soul magnifies the Lord", which is sung during the Roman Catholic evening prayer or vespers service.

The ensemble's repertoire covers the sweep of religious, stage, and chamber music of the 17th Century by such giants as Claudio Monteverdi, Giacomo Carissimi, Alessandro Stradella, Marc-Antoine Charpentier, Heinrich Schütz, Dieterich Buxtehude, Henry Purcell, and lesser-known and infrequently performed composers of the era.

Magnificat has particularly championed and performed music by women composers Francesca Caccini, Isabella Leonarda, Barbara Strozzi and Chiara Margarita Cozzolani and has hosted a conference on Women and Music in Seventeenth Century Italy.  Magnificat's annual concerts, recordings, and participation in music festivals have won audience and critical acclaim, and engaged the collaboration of respected scholars and musicologists.

In addition to their own concerts in the San Francisco Bay Area, Magnificat has been presented by The Berkeley Early Music Festival, The Seattle Early Music Guild, The Carmel Bach Festival, Music Before 1800, The Tropical Baroque Festival, and The Society for Seventeenth Century Music. They have recorded for the Koch International and Music Omnia labels.

Since 1989 Magnificat has provided period instrument ensembles to San Francisco Bay Area choral groups desiring to bring historically-informed performance practice to their concerts through its affiliate, the Jubilate Orchestra, which has now collaborated in over 300 performances with a variety of groups.

Repertoire
Magnificat's repertoire includes the genres of sacred music motets, masses, vespers, cantatas and oratorios, as well as vocal chamber music, opera, pastorales and other works for the stage. It is particularly noted for its musical reconstruction of religious works in the liturgical context in which they were first performed.  Religious works are performed with all the music a 17th-century audience would have heard in church including liturgical chants and prayers. Audiences are invited to join in singing congregational hymns and chorales that form part of the reconstruction.

Outstanding among its reconstructions is the performance of all the music performed at the rededication of the chapel of St. Gertrude in Hamburg in 1607. A premier musical establishment severely damaged by fire, its rededication drew the collaboration of major composers of North Germany.  Following the composer's suggestion Magnificat performed Heinrich Schütz’ Musikalische Exequien as a paraphrase for the Kyrie and Gloria in a Lutheran mass for the Feast of the Purification at the Berkeley Early Music Festival in 1996 and again in their own series in 2009.

Magnificat's signature work is Monteverdi's great Vespro della Beata Vergine 1610 (Vespers of the Blessed Virgin of 1610) written to win the prestigious musical directorship of St. Mark's in Venice and which Magnificat performed in 1994 and 1999. It was again performed in 2010 to mark the work's 400th anniversary.

Magnificat has performed the first opera buffa featuring a basso buffo in the title role, Stradella's  Il Trespolo tutore, and will perform the first opera written by a woman, Francesca Caccini's  La Liberazione di Ruggiero in October 2009. It has also staged performances of Charpentier's rarely performed music for Jean-Baptiste Molière's comedy Le Malade Imaginaire.

Notable among its opera productions have been its performances with the Carter Family Marionettes of the puppet opera La Grandmère amoureuse by Fuzelier and Dorneval from the ParisianThéâtre de la foire "theaters of the fair" tradition and Jacopo Melani’s Il Girello.  The October 2009 presentations of Caccini's La Liberazione di Ruggiero will be performed with the Carters according to the Sicilian puppet tradition.

Esthetic
Emerging from the early music revival Magnificat was originally conceived as a collective of equal parts - a "chamber music" esthetic grounded in the talent and individual inspiration of Magnificat's musicians that is reflected in its interpretations and recognized by its audiences. Over the years, Magnificat has been guided by the spirit of the period in its emphasis on dramatic narrative and sensitive emotional expression.  The ensemble has given numerous contemporary premieres of music not heard for the last 200 – 300 years. Because much music of the 17th century still remains unavailable, performing editions have been prepared from original manuscript sources by Stewart and musicologists on Magnificat's Artistic Advisory Board.

Organization
Magnificat is a California 501(c)(3) non-profit organization governed by a Board of Directors whose current president is Nicholas Elsishans. Stewart serves as its Musical Director and Dominque Pelletey as its Managing Director. Nina Korniyenko serves as Creative Director and Boby Borisov as Audio Engineer. The group's agent is Robert Friedman Presents.

An Advisory Board of scholars and musicologists contribute advice, performing editions, and scholarly essays for programs, websites, and CD notes which are posted on Magnificat's website. Advisory Board members are Alan Curtis of the ensemble Il Complesso Barocco; Robert Kendrick (University of Chicago); Jeffrey Kurtzman (Washington University in St. Louis); John Powell, (University of Tulsa); Elanor Selfridge-Field (Stanford University); and Kate van Orden (University of California, Berkeley).

Recent performance history

2009–2010
 Francesca Caccini: La Liberazione di Ruggiero
 Chiara Margarita Cozzolani:  Mass for Christmas Day
 Alessandro Grandi and Tarquinio Merula:  Celesti Fiori
 Claudio Monteverdi:  Vespro della Beata Vergine 1610

2008–2009
 Marc-Antoine Charpentier: Les plaisirs de Versailles and La Couronne des Fleurs
 Giovanni Antonio Rigatti: Motets
 Heinrich Schütz: Musikalische Exequien as a setting for a Mass for the Feast of the Purification
 Alessandro Scarlatti: Venere, Amore, e Ragione

2007–2008
Musical reconstruction of the 1607 Re-Dedication of St. Gertrude's Chapel in Hamburg
 Alessandro Scarlatti and Arcangelo Corelli:  Christmas Cantatas for the papal court
 Marc-Antoine Charpentier:  Petits Motets
 Alessandro Stradella:  Il Trespolo tutore

2006–2007
 Marc-Antoine Charpentier: Le Jugement de Solomon
 Dieterich Buxtehude:  Cantatas for Advent and Christmas
 Alessandro Stradella: Oratorio per La Susanna
 Chiara Margarita Cozzolani:  Vespro della Beata Vergine

2005–2006
 Giovanni Battista Guarini: Il Pastor Fido settings by various composers
 Marc-Antoine Charpentier:  Pastorale sur la Naissance de Nostre Seigneur
 Johann Rosenmüller:  Vespers for the Feast of the Annunciation

Discography
 Chiara Margarita Cozzolani:  Vespro della Beata Vergine - Musica Omnia MO0103 released December, 2001
 Chiara Margarita Cozzolani:  Messa Pascale - Musica Omnia MO0209 released July, 2002
 Giacomo Carissimi:  Oratorio - Vanitas Vanitatum
 Emilio de' Cavalieri: Opera - Rappresentatione di Anima, et di Corpo - Koch International

CD's and downloads of these recordings are available at Magnificat's website as are selections of individual pieces from its performances.

See also
 Early music
 Early music revival
 Baroque music
 Historically-informed performance
 List of early music ensembles

Further reading
 Francesca Caccini's La Liberazione di Ruggiero and the Culture of Women by Susan G. Cusick
 "Hope dies hard in the artist -Tony Parisi and the Sicilian Puppet Tradition by Warren Stewart
 Hamburg Gertruden Musik by Frederick K. Gable
 Performing Sacred Music in Liturgical Context by Warren Stewart
 Seventeenth Century Music: To Speak Through Singing by Warren Stewart

External sources
 Magnificat website
 Magnificat blog
 Carter Family Marionettes
 Magnificat Musicians
 Creative Director Nika Korniyenko
 Jubilate Orchestra Projects

Early music groups
Musical groups established in 1989
Musical groups from San Francisco